Phtheochroa villana is a species of moth of the family Tortricidae. It is found in North America, where it has been recorded from Colorado, Alberta, Indiana, Maine, New Mexico, North Dakota and Ohio.

The wingspan is 19–21 mm. Adults have been recorded on wing from June to August.

References

Moths described in 1907
Phtheochroa